Patrick John Miguel van Aanholt (born 29 August 1990) is a Dutch professional footballer who plays as a left-back for Eredivisie club PSV, on loan from  club Galatasaray, and the Netherlands national team.

He began his professional career at Chelsea, where he was used sparingly, spending time on loan at five other clubs. He joined Sunderland for around £1.5 million in 2014 and was transferred to Crystal Palace in January 2017, for a fee rising to £14 million.

Van Aanholt represented the Netherlands at numerous youth levels before making his full international debut in 2013. He played for the senior side at UEFA Euro 2020.

Early life
Van Aanholt was born in 's-Hertogenbosch to parents from Curaçao. He is the cousin of fellow Dutch international Leroy Fer.

Club career

Chelsea
Van Aanholt joined Chelsea's youth ranks in 2007, making his professional debut while on loan at Coventry City on 9 August 2009 in a 2–1 Football League Championship win over Ipswich Town. He was later recalled to Chelsea in December due to the exit of many players due to the African Nations Cup.

Van Aanholt was first selected for Chelsea in an FA Cup tie away to Preston North End in the 2009–10 edition of the Cup, wearing the squad number 52, but did not make an appearance, remaining on the bench. He made his Chelsea debut on 24 March 2010 in a 0–5 away win at Portsmouth, replacing Yuri Zhirkov at left-back after 71 minutes. He then made his home debut, on 27 March 2010, against Aston Villa in a 7–1 victory, again as a substitute. On 29 January 2010, Van Aanholt joined Newcastle United on a one-month loan deal after regular left back José Enrique suffered an injury. He provided cover for the Spaniard, sustaining Newcastle's productive left flank alongside Jonás Gutiérrez. Van Aanholt played his last game in the 1–2 away victory at Watford.

Van Aanholt scored his first career goal on 22 September 2010 in the 4–3 defeat to former club Newcastle in the League Cup. On 26 January 2011, he joined Leicester City on loan until the end of the season. He made his debut in a 1–0 win over Sheffield United on 1 February 2011, and suffered a torn muscle in his thigh at the end of the month after playing six games. Van Aanholt scored his first senior league goal in a 4–0 victory over Burnley on 9 April 2011.

On transfer deadline day, 31 August 2011, Van Aanholt signed for Wigan Athletic on a season-long loan deal. Van Aanholt's loan spell, originally a season-long arrangement, was later terminated by mutual consent between all three parties. During this uneventful loan spell, Van Aanholt played three league matches and one League Cup tie for the Latics, but did not feature in their first team after 1 October.

Vitesse (loan spells)

On 6 January 2012, Van Aanholt returned to Chelsea during a season-long loan at Wigan. Nine days later, he signed for Dutch club Vitesse on loan until the end of the season, alongside fellow Chelsea teammates Tomáš Kalas and Ulises Dávila. On 11 July 2012, Van Aanholt rejoined Vitesse on a new loan deal for the 2012–13 season. On 7 July 2013, the Vitesse loan deal was extended for the 2013–14 season. He made his first start of the 2013–14 season in a 1–1 first leg draw away at Petrolul Ploiești in the UEFA Europa League, a match in which he was booked in the 86th minute. He went on to start eight of the next nine league fixtures for Vitesse, including earning an assist in a 1–1 draw at Roda JC.

On 7 December 2013, Van Aanholt netted Vitesse's fifth goal in a 2–6 away victory over PSV, keeping Vitesse at the top of the Eredivisie table.

Sunderland

2014–15 season
On 25 July 2014, Van Aanholt left Chelsea and signed for Sunderland for an undisclosed fee, believed to be between £1.5–2 million, on a four-year contract. He made his competitive debut on 16 August as Sunderland began their Premier League campaign away to West Bromwich Albion, assisting Sebastian Larsson for the final goal of a 2–2 draw. On 3 November, as Sunderland won 1–3 at Crystal Palace; Van Aanholt set up the opening goal for Steven Fletcher, but was later stretchered off in the first-half with a shoulder injury and replaced by Wes Brown. Van Aanholt scored his first goal for Sunderland on his return from injury on 4 January 2015, the only goal in an FA Cup third round win over Leeds United.

2015–16 season
On 28 November 2015, Van Aanholt scored the first goal in a 2–0 win at home against Stoke City. He scored his second of the season on 16 January 2016, where he gave Sunderland the lead against Tottenham Hotspur, although Sunderland would go on to lose 4–1. His third of the season came the following week, on 23 January 2016, where he scored the equaliser in a 1–1 draw at home to AFC Bournemouth. He scored his fourth goal of the season when he opened the scoring with a 25-yard free-kick in a 3–0 win against Everton. The result sealed Sunderland's Premier League safety, and relegated local rivals Newcastle United, along with Norwich City.

On 8 June 2016, Van Aanholt put pen to paper, signing a new four-year deal, keeping him at the club until the year 2020.

2016–17 season
On 13 August 2016, in the opening game of the season, Van Aanholt conceded an early penalty, as Sunderland fell to a 2–1 defeat at Manchester City. He scored his first goal of the season on 21 August 2016 in a 1–2 Premier League defeat to Middlesbrough On 1 October, he came off the bench to score a late equaliser in a 1–1 draw at home to West Brom. Van Aanholt scored his third goal of the season on 17 December to give Sunderland a 1–0 home win against Watford.

Crystal Palace
On 30 January 2017, it was confirmed that Van Aanholt had moved to Crystal Palace on a four-and-a-half-year deal for an initial fee of £9 million, rising to £14 million, rejoining his former Sunderland manager Sam Allardyce. He was given the number 3 shirt. Van Aanholt made his first appearance for Palace in a 2–0 win at Bournemouth on 31 January. His home debut, a 0–4 loss to former club Sunderland at Selhurst Park, came four days later.

On 25 February 2017, Van Aanholt scored his first goal for Crystal Palace in a 1–0 victory against relegation rivals Middlesbrough.

On 24 August 2019, Van Aanholt scored a last minute winner against Manchester United in an away game which Crystal Palace won 2–1. Van Aanholt became the first away player to score a last minute winner at Old Trafford in the Premier League.

On 16 July 2020, Van Aanholt suffered a dislocated shoulder while playing in a Premier League match against Manchester United. He received oxygen and was taken off of the pitch on a stretcher. The injury was expected to keep him out of action for up to two months and into the following season.

Galatasaray 
On 28 July 2021, Galatasaray announced the signing of Van Aanholt on three-year free transfer deal.

Loan to PSV 
On 1 February 2023, Van Aanholt was loaned to Eredivisie side PSV Eindhoven until the end of the season.

International career

On 19 November 2013, Van Aanholt won his first senior cap for the Netherlands in a friendly match against Colombia, coming on in injury time for Memphis Depay in a 0–0 draw at the Amsterdam Arena.

In September 2017, Van Aanholt was called up to the Curaçao national football team for a friendly against Qatar, but he did not make an appearance. As all his international appearances for the Netherlands had been in friendly matches, he was still eligible to represent Curaçao.

He was included in Ronald Koeman's first starting line up when the Netherlands took on England on 23 March 2018 in a friendly international.

Career statistics

Club

International

References

External links

 
 Patrick van Aanholt at Voetbal International 
 
 
 
 

1990 births
Living people
Sportspeople from 's-Hertogenbosch
Footballers from North Brabant
Dutch footballers
Netherlands youth international footballers
Netherlands under-21 international footballers
Netherlands international footballers
Association football fullbacks
Chelsea F.C. players
Coventry City F.C. players
Newcastle United F.C. players
Leicester City F.C. players
Wigan Athletic F.C. players
SBV Vitesse players
Sunderland A.F.C. players
Crystal Palace F.C. players
Galatasaray S.K. footballers
PSV Eindhoven players
Premier League players
English Football League players
Eredivisie players
Süper Lig players
UEFA Euro 2020 players
Dutch expatriate footballers
Dutch expatriate sportspeople in England
Dutch expatriate sportspeople in Turkey
Expatriate footballers in England
Expatriate footballers in Turkey
Dutch people of Curaçao descent